Vescovato Cathedral (Pro-cathédrale Saint-Martin de Vescovato) is a Catholic church in Vescovato, Corsica. It was the seat of a Roman Catholic diocese between 1440 and 1570. The cathedral is now the parish church of St. Martin.

The Bishop of Mariana built the church here in 1380. After the church had been enlarged and ornamented in 1436 the seat of the diocese of Mariana was moved from its former location in Lucciana Cathedral to Vescovato in 1440. It was transferred in 1570 to Bastia Cathedral.

All Corsican bishoprics were suppressed in favour of the Bishop of Ajaccio in 1801.

References
 Commune de Vescovato (Casinca): patrimoine communale 

Cathedrals in Corsica
Former cathedrals in France